Sainte-Anne-de-Sorel is a municipality in the Pierre-De Saurel Regional County Municipality, in the Montérégie region of Quebec. The community consists of a mainland section along with several islands extending into Lac Saint-Pierre. The population as of the Canada 2011 Census was 2,742, which makes it the largest municipality and the second largest urban division of the RCM.

From 2006 throughout 2010 there has been much speculation about Sainte-Anne willing to merge into Sorel-Tracy to become a district (much like the former Saint-Pierre-de-Sorel and Tracy municipalities), however at the present time there has been no future talk about it at both city halls. The RCM planning administration is against the merger though, as it would compromise development potential in Sainte-Anne in favor of Sorel, since property evaluation services would be unified.

Demographics

Population
Population trend:

Language
Mother tongue language (2006)

See also
List of municipalities in Quebec

References

Incorporated places in Pierre-De Saurel Regional County Municipality
Quebec populated places on the Saint Lawrence River
Municipalities in Quebec